Katrin Suder (born 29 September 1971), is a German politician and management consultant. From 2014 to 2018, she was a permanent state secretary in the Federal Ministry of Defense.

Biography
Katrin Suder was born in Mainz on 29 September 1971.

Suder studied physics at RWTH Aachen. In 2000, she received her doctorate in neuroinformatics at the Ruhr University Bochum. Suder also received a bachelor's degree in theater and linguistics there. She was a scholarship holder of the German National Academic Foundation.

From 2000, Suder worked for the management consultancy McKinsey and in 2007 took over the company's Berlin office. She made a career as a consultant for the German and international IT industry and became a director at McKinsey in 2010, where she dealt with diversity management, among other things. From 2009 to 2014 she was responsible for the company's activities in the public sector. Suder worked for several years as a manager at the interface between administration and the private sector, leading reform projects for the Federal Employment Agency and developing a concept for improving the start-up culture for the State of Berlin. At McKinsey, she campaigned for an open-minded approach to different sexual orientations (LGBT diversity management).

Politics
Suder was sworn in on 1 August 2014 as a permanent state secretary in the Federal Ministry of Defense with the task of reforming the armaments sector. She thus succeeded , who was put into temporary retirement in February 2014.

The departments  Equipment  and  Cyber / Information Technology  were directly subordinated to her; It was also responsible for matters relating to the Planning Department.

With her, Gundbert Scherf moved from McKinsey to the Federal Ministry of Defense in September 2014. He temporarily stood in for her during her baby break, but left the ministry two years later.

Suder was sanctioned and banned from entering the country by Russia in May 2015. Her name was on a list of 89 EU politicians; According to Russian sources, the ban was a reaction to sanctions against Russia.

From 11 to 14 June 2015, she took part in the 63rd Bilderberg Conference in Telfs-Buchen, Austria.

At her own request, she resigned from the office of State Secretary in April 2018. As a farewell, Minister Ursula von der Leyen awarded her the Bundeswehr Cross of Honor in gold. In August 2018, Suder took over the chairmanship of the newly founded ten-member digital council of the German federal government.

Personal life

Suder lives with her partner Katja Kraus, in Hamburg and has three children. At the beginning of March 2017, she and Kraus registered a civil partnership.

She volunteers for the children's rights organization Save the Children. Until 2015, she was committed to the association Lesbenfrühling e.V.

In 2015 she became a member of the Board of Trustees of the Hertie School. She has been a Senior Fellow at the Hertie School since November 1, 2018.

In May 2021, she was supposed to head the newly created IT department on the Board of Management of the Volkswagen Group, but was rejected by the supervisory board.

References

External links

1971 births
Living people
People from Mainz
German LGBT politicians
Ruhr University Bochum alumni